Miss Universe Trinidad & Tobago is a beauty pageant held annually since 1963, a year after Trinidad & Tobago's independence from the United Kingdom. The contest is meant to select a suitable delegate from both islands to compete in the Miss Universe pageant.

History
Trinidad debuted at Miss Universe in 1963 and in the time the country used "Trinidad" at Miss Universe. The first candidate was Jean Stodart. She competed at Miss Universe 1963 in the United States. Began in 1966 Trinidad and Tobago began to compete as Trinidad and Tobago at Miss Universe pageant.

International winners
The country's representative in 1977, Janelle Commissiong, became the first person of African ethnicity to win the Miss Universe contest, which was hosted in Santo Domingo, Dominican Republic.

In 1998 Wendy Fitzwilliam captured the Miss Universe title in Hawaii, USA. She is the second woman from Trinidad and Tobago to win the coveted title after Janelle “Penny” Commissiong.

Miss Universe 1999
In May, 1999, the Miss Universe pageant was hosted at the Chaguaramas Convention Centre in Chaguaramas, Trinidad & Tobago. A record 84 nations were represented. The winner that year was Mpule Kwelagobe of Botswana. This was also the first time that two women of African descent won on consecutive occasions, with the prior year's winner being Wendy Fitzwilliam of Trinidad and Tobago.

Titleholders

The winner of Miss Universe Trinidad and Tobago represents her country at the Miss Universe pageant.  On occasion, when the winner does not qualify (due to age) for either contest, a runner-up is sent. Trinidad & Tobago has had two Miss Universe winners since the pageant's inception in 1952.

See also
 Miss Trinidad and Tobago

References

External links
Miss Universe Organization

Trinidad and Tobago
Beauty pageants in Trinidad and Tobago
Recurring events established in 1963